Bubber is a nickname and surname which may refer to:

People:
 Bubber or Bubba Brooks (1922-2002), American jazz tenor saxophonist
 James Bubber Epps (born 1943), American politician
 Clarence James Bubber Jonnard (1897-1977), American Major League Baseball catcher
 James "Bubber" Miley (1903-1932), American jazz trumpet and cornet player
 Charles M. Murphy (coach) (1913-1999), American football, basketball and baseball player and Middle Tennessee State University head coach
 Riva Bubber, Indian television actress
 Bubber or Niels Christian Meyer, Danish television host

Fictional characters:
 Charlie "Bubber" Reeves, a main character in the 1966 film The Chase, played by Robert Redford
 John Bubber, a main character in the 1992 film Hero, played by Andy Garcia

See also
 Bubba

Lists of people by nickname